The Lycée français Louis Pasteur is a French international school in Bogotá, Colombia. It serves the levels maternelle until lycée (senior high school).

History
The school officially opened on 15 February 1934. It initially had 35 students and had been established by francophile José de la Vega, along with some of his friends. It moved to a larger campus in 1936 and took its current name in 1943. The school bought additional land in 1947 so it could expand. It had 1,000 students in 1961, and this increased to 1,850 in 1972. Its preschool/nursery opened in 1972. In the summer of 2002 the courtyard received renovations, and in 2003 a new gymnasium opened.

Student body
 the school had 1,980 students from 37 countries, with 64.4% of the students being Colombian and 30% of the students being French or binational. There were 1,058 primary school students and 915 secondary school students.

Around that time the trend included an increase in French/binational students and a decrease in Colombian students. In 2007 students came from 21 countries, and 72.5% of the students were Colombian. In 2008 the school had 1,766 students. In September 2013 the school had 1,936 students from 29 countries; that year 69% of the students were Colombian and 26% of the students were French/binational.

References

External links

  Lycée français Louis Pasteur
  Lycée français Louis Pasteur
 

International schools in Bogotá
Bogota
1934 establishments in Colombia
Educational institutions established in 1934